Zenon Pigoń (29 June 1940 – 13 January 2023) was a Polish trade unionist and politician.

Pigoń died in Bytom on 13 January 2023, at the age of 82.

References

1940 births
2023 deaths
Polish United Workers' Party members
Centre Agreement politicians
Recipients of Cross of Freedom and Solidarity
University of Silesia in Katowice alumni
Members of the Contract Sejm
People from Rivne Oblast